Albania–Slovenia relations are diplomatic relations between the Republic of Albania and the Republic of Slovenia. Albania has an embassy in Ljubljana and Slovenia has an embassy in Tirana. Both countries established diplomatic relations on 9 March 1992.

The countries are members of the North Atlantic Treaty Organization (NATO) and the Organization for Security and Co-operation in Europe. As a European Union (EU) member, Slovenia supports Albania in its euro-integration path.

See also 
 Foreign relations of Albania
 Foreign relations of Slovenia
 Accession of Albania to the European Union
 Albania–Yugoslavia relations

References

 
Slovenia
Bilateral relations of Slovenia